Justin Green (born February 26, 1991) is an American football cornerback who is currently a free agent. He was signed by the New England Patriots as an undrafted free agent in 2013, and has also been a member of the Dallas Cowboys. He played college football for University of Illinois at Urbana–Champaign.

Professional career

New England Patriots
Green signed with the New England Patriots on July 21, 2013. He was waived on August 31 for final roster cuts, but signed to the practice squad the following day. He was promoted to the active roster on November 23. He was waived again on November 26 then re-signed to their practice squad two days later. The Patriots promoted Green from the practice squad on December 28.

Dallas Cowboys
On August 12, 2014, Green was traded to the Dallas Cowboys for defensive end Ben Bass. Green was released on September 1, 2014.

San Jose SaberCats
On November 19, 2014, Green was assigned to the San Jose SaberCats of the Arena Football League.

New England Patriots
On December 3, 2014, Green was re-signed to the New England Patriots practice squad. Green won Super Bowl XLIX with the Patriots after they defeated the defending champion Seattle Seahawks 28-24.

San Jose SaberCats (II) 
Green returned to the SaberCats for the 2016 season, however he did not see any action.

Winnipeg Blue Bombers 
On April 4, 2016, the Winnipeg Blue Bombers of the Canadian Football League announced the signing of Green. He was released on May 24, 2016.

He participated in The Spring League in 2017.

Personal life
Green's older brother, Marcus, is a former defensive tackle who played collegiately for Ohio State and had a short stint in the NFL. In the summer of 2015, Green retired from football to focus on pursuing a career to help children in the community. However this was only temporary as he continued his pursuit of playing professional football the following year.

References

External links
Illinois Fighting Illini football bio
New England Patriots bio

1991 births
Living people
American football cornerbacks
Canadian football defensive backs
American players of Canadian football
Illinois Fighting Illini football players
Dallas Cowboys players
New England Patriots players
San Jose SaberCats players
Players of American football from Louisville, Kentucky
Players of Canadian football from Louisville, Kentucky
Louisville Male High School alumni
Winnipeg Blue Bombers players
The Spring League players